CASM may refer to:

 Canadian Air and Space Museum, a former museum located in Toronto
 Centre d'Art Santa Mònica, a public venue in Barcelona, Spain
 Centre for Aboriginal Studies in Music, part of the University of Adelaide
 Centre for the Analysis of Social Media, a group founded by the UK think tank Demos
 Certificate of Advanced Study in Mathematics, a qualification formerly gained from Part III of the Mathematical Tripos at Cambridge University
 Chinese Academy of Surveying and Mapping, an organization affiliated with the State Bureau of Surveying and Mapping
 Collaborative group on Artisanal and Small-Scale Mining, an association for artisanal mining
 Cost per Available Seat Mile, a measure of unit cost in the airline industry